Willow Geer (born March 2, 1981) is an American actress.

Geer was born in Los Angeles. She is a third-generation actor/actress, the daughter of actress Ellen Geer and children's musician Peter Alsop and the granddaughter of actor Will Geer (best known for his role in The Waltons as Grandpa Walton).

She worked as voice actress in the console Survival game Lost Odyssey and in the animated film Teenage Mutant Ninja Turtles.

Filmography

References

External links

1981 births
Living people
Actresses from Los Angeles
American stage actresses
American voice actresses
21st-century American actresses